The Prime Element is a jazz album by jazz drummer Elvin Jones, originally released in 1976 as part of the "Blue Note Re-issue Series". The pieces compiled here were recorded in 1969 and 1973. The tracks from 1973 (#A1 to #B2) would be included on At This Point in Time in 1998. The remainder can only be found on the eight-disc Mosaic compilation The Complete Blue Note Elvin Jones Sessions, issued in 2000.

Track listing
Side A
 "At This Point in Time" (Frank Foster) – 7:34
 "Currents/Pollen" (Gene Perla, D. Garcia) – 11:13

Side B
 "The Prime Element" (Omar Clay) – 8:19
 "Whims of Bal" (Clay) – 12:24

Side C
 "Inner Space" (Chick Corea) - 6:32
 "Once I Loved [O Amor Em Paz]" (Jobim, De Moraez) - 6:22
 "Raynay" (Elvin Jones) - 7:57

Side D
 "Champagne Baby" (Joe Farrell) - 11:26
 "Dido Afrique" (Jones) - 11:13

Recorded on March 14, 1969 (#C1-D2), July 24 (#B1-B2) and July 26 (#A1-A2), 1973.

Personnel
Tracks A1-B2
Elvin Jones - drums, leader
Steve Grossman - soprano and tenor saxophone
Frank Foster - soprano and tenor saxophone
Pepper Adams - baritone saxophone
Cornell Dupree - guitar
Jan Hammer - piano, electric piano, synthesizer
Gene Perla - bass, electric bass
Candido Camero - congas
Richie 'Pablo' Landrum - percussion
Omar Clay - percussion, programmable rhythm box
Warren Smith: tympani

Tracks C1-D2
Elvin Jones - drums
Lee Morgan - trumpet
Joe Farrell - soprano saxophone, tenor saxophone, flute, alto flute
George Coleman - tenor saxophone
Wilbur Little - bass
Candido Camero - congas
Miovelito Valles - percussion

References

Elvin Jones albums
Blue Note Records albums
1976 albums